South Korea competed at the 1993 East Asian Games held in Shanghai, China PR from May 9, 1993 to May 18, 1993. South Korea finished third with 23 gold medals, 28 silver medals, and 40 bronze medals.

Medal summary

References

East Asian Games
1993 East Asian Games
South Korea at the East Asian Games